No Peace Under the Olive Tree (Italian: Non c'è pace tra gli ulivi) is a 1950 Italian neorealist drama film directed by Giuseppe De Santis and starring Raf Vallone, Lucia Bosé and Folco Lulli. It was the director's follow-up to Bitter Rice (1949) which also starred Vallone. It was originally planned to partner him with Silvana Mangano again, but due to her pregnancy she was replaced by Lucia Bosé. Despite the commercial success of Bitter Rice, the Communist De Santis had been stung by left-wing criticism due to American cultural elements included the film which he purposefully excluded from the follow-up. He also included characters who were less ambiguous and concluded with a happy ending, similar to those of Socialist realism.

The film's sets were designed by the art director Carlo Egidi. Location shooting took place around Fondi in Lazio, the hometown of director De Santis.

Synopsis
A young shepherd returns home after the Second World War having been held in a prisoner of war camp. He finds that the local landowner has stolen his sheep and his girlfriend. When he also assaults and murders his sister, the shepherd takes revenge.

Cast
Raf Vallone as Francesco Dominici
Lucia Bosé as Lucia
Folco Lulli as Agostino Bonfiglio
Maria Grazia Francia as Maria Grazia
Dante Maggio as Salvatore
Michele Riccardini as the Maresciallo
Vincenzo Talarico as the lawyer
Pietro Tordi as Don Gaetano

References

Bibliography
 Gundle, Stephen. Fame Amid the Ruins: Italian Film Stardom in the Age of Neorealism. Berghahn Books, 2019.

External links

 
 Adriano Aprà: Under Close Watch: Under the Olive Tree

1950 films
1950s Italian-language films
Italian neorealist films
Films directed by Giuseppe De Santis
1950 drama films
Italian drama films
Films set in Lazio
Films shot in Lazio
Lux Film films
Italian black-and-white films
1950s Italian films